Sphodromantis centralis, common name African mantis or Central African mantis, is a species of praying mantis from Africa.

See also
African mantis
List of mantis genera and species

References

Centralis
Mantodea of Africa
Insects of Cameroon
Insects of the Central African Republic
Insects of the Democratic Republic of the Congo
Insects of Gabon
Insects of the Republic of the Congo
Fauna of Central Africa
Insects described in 1914